Cerro Azul is a municipality in the state of Paraná in the Southern Region of Brazil.

The municipality contains part of the  Campinhos State Park, created in 1960.

See also
List of municipalities in Paraná

References

Municipalities in Paraná